The Center for Design Research (CDR) is a research center at Stanford University, in Stanford, California. The Center for Design Research was founded in 1984 by a collection of faculty from Stanford's  Design Division, with money from companies including Apple Computer, BMW, Hewlett-Packard, Sun Microsystems, and Toshiba Corporation. Today, CDR acts as a nexus for graduate students and researchers in a number of affiliated research labs, including those headed by Professors Larry Leifer (Director), Mark Cutkosky, Sheri D. Sheppard, and Allison Okamura.

The CDR is located in Building 560 at 424 Panama Mall, at the center of the "Design Quad".

See also
 Stanford University
 Stanford Joint Program in Design

References

External links
 Official CDR Web Site
 Design Group at Stanford University
 Stanford Mechanical Engineering 310 (me310) Web Site
 Stanford Foresight Engineering Web Site
 The Hasso Plattner Institute of Design
 Stanford Joint Program in Design

Center for Design Research
1958 establishments in California
Design schools in the United States
Educational institutions established in 1958